Agustín Nicolás Dattola (born 20 April 1999) is an Argentine professional footballer who plays as a centre-back for Almirante Brown.

Career
Dattola began with Almirante Brown. He made the breakthrough into senior football under manager Blas Giunta midway through 2018–19, appearing for his debut in Primera B Metropolitana on 16 February 2019 against Fénix. Dattola again played the full duration of the club's next nine fixtures, a streak that was ended after he received a red card versus Atlanta on 14 April.

Career statistics
.

References

External links

1999 births
Living people
Place of birth missing (living people)
Argentine footballers
Association football defenders
Primera B Metropolitana players
Club Almirante Brown footballers